"Saviour" is the lead single from Canadian singer-songwriter Lights debut album The Listening (2009). It was released on July 6, 2009 in Canada, April 13, 2010 in the United States and May 9, 2010 in the United Kingdom. A week after the song's release in Canada, the song has entered the Canadian Hot 100, debuting at number 49.

Background
The song is about Lights telling someone of her troubles and how she doesn't like who she's become. Furthermore, she tells them that one day, she will need them to save her. In an interview, Lights said that the start of the chorus ("I just wanna run to you") sounds like crying because she was actually crying while she wrote the song.

Composition
The song is a poppy, keyboard-driven new wave ballad. Lights uses the Auto-Tune effect in this song.

Music video
The video features Lights drawing comics in her bedroom, which gradually animate and send her comic self into outer space. Lights lands on a desolate planet and walks around, looking for something. She picks up a crystal with a flower growing inside it, and plants it into the earth, causing the dark sky to become filled with light and the plants to thrive once again - she becomes the "saviour" of the planet. Meanwhile, the real Lights plays her keytar, draws, and walks around her bedroom, discovering things that had appeared in the comic. The video concludes with her blowing on a pink flower that begins to glow with ethereal light. This is a prequel to the Drive My Soul video. Lights has a second version of this music video where added parts to the video are shown.

Track listing

Charts

Certifications

Release history

References

Lights (musician) songs
2009 singles
2010 singles
Synth-pop ballads
2009 songs
Sire Records singles
Songs written by Tawgs Salter
Songs written by Lights (musician)
2000s ballads